Baltic Women's Volleyball League is the top official competition for women's volleyball clubs in Baltic states (Estonia, Latvia and Lithuania). It started in 2007 with only Estonian and Latvian teams participating, Lithuanian teams joined the following 2007–08 season.

See also
Baltic Men Volleyball League

References

External links
Baltic Women's Volleyball League at Estonian Volleyball Federation

Women's volleyball leagues
Volleyball leagues in Estonia
Volleyball leagues in Latvia
Volleyball leagues in Lithuania
Sport in the Baltic states
European women's volleyball club competitions
Sports leagues established in 2007
2007 establishments in Europe
Multi-national professional sports leagues